The Embley River is a river located in Far North Queensland, Australia.

The headwaters of the river rise on the coastal plain of the Cape York Peninsula and flow in a north westerly direction eventually discharging at Evans Landing into Albatross Bay near Nanum just south of Weipa and into the Gulf of Carpentaria.

From source to mouth, the Embley River is joined by five tributaries including the Hey River. The Embley River descends  over its  course.

The river was named in 1895 by John Douglas  after the surveyor, John Thomas Embley (1858-1937), while Douglas was Government Resident on Thursday Island.

See also

References

Rivers of Far North Queensland
Gulf of Carpentaria